King Abdullah may refer to:

Abdullah II of Jordan (born 1962), king of Jordan since 1999
Abdullah I of Jordan (1882–1951), king of Transjordan
Abdullah Khan II (1533/4–1598), ruler of the Khanate of Bukhara
Abdullah of Pahang (born 1959), the Yang di-Pertuan Agong (King) of Malaysia and the Sultan of Pahang since 2019
Abdullah of Saudi Arabia (1924–2015), king of Saudi Arabia

See also
 Abdullah (disambiguation)
 Abdullah I (disambiguation)
 Abdullah II (disambiguation)
 Abdullah Khan (disambiguation)